Jason Clarence Kreis (born December 29, 1972) is an American soccer coach and former player who currently serves as an assistant coach for MLS club Inter Miami CF and as head coach of the United States under-23 team. He coached Orlando City SC in Major League Soccer and was previously an assistant coach under Jürgen Klinsmann for the United States men's national soccer team. Prior to that he was the head coach of New York City FC and Real Salt Lake.

Kreis spent the majority of his playing career in Major League Soccer in the United States, initially with the Dallas Burn, and later with Real Salt Lake. In total he made over 300 professional appearances, was Major League Soccer MVP in 1999, and is currently tied for the fifth highest scorer in MLS regular season history, with 108 goals. He also earned fourteen international caps for the United States national team.  At one point in his playing career, he was the all-time leading scorer in MLS.

Early life 
Kreis played for the Gladiator Soccer Club in his hometown of Omaha, Nebraska, where his parents were among the pioneers who established this first premier/select club within the state. As a freshman at Burke High School in Omaha, Kreis was selected First Team All-State.  He remains the only freshman selected to the first team. Following his freshman year, Kreis and his family moved to Mandeville, Louisiana, where he led Mandeville High School to several Class 5A state soccer tournaments, but never won a state title, losing to Lafayette High, led by stars Shammi Gupta and Wayne Shullaw, in the quarterfinals his senior year. While at Mandeville, he was also a standout performer for the Baton Rouge United Jags, a U-19 Select team that finished as national runner-up in 1991 and won the prestigious Capital Cup tournament in Washington, D.C. 

He played collegiately at Duke University in Durham, North Carolina. A first team All-America pick in 1993 and 1994, Kreis finished his college career with 39 goals and 38 assists, ranking fifth all-time in scoring.

Club career

Minor leagues 
In 1993, Kreis played during the summer for the Raleigh Flyers of the USISL.  In the summer of 1994, he returned to Louisiana to play for the New Orleans Riverboat Gamblers, also of the USISL.  After finishing his collegiate eligibility in 1994, Kreis signed his first professional contract with the Raleigh Flyers in the spring of 1995.

Dallas Burn 
On August 1, 1995, Kreis signed a contract with Major League Soccer as the league prepared for its inaugural season. Kreis was drafted forty-third overall by the Dallas Burn in the fifth round of the MLS Inaugural Draft. He scored the first goal in Burn history. In 1999, Kreis was the first American-born player to be named league MVP after he led the league in points and goals, and also registered the first 15-goal, 15-assist season in league history. The five-time all-star led his team in goals five times and in points four times.

On June 26, 2004, Kreis scored his eighty-ninth league goal against D.C. United, moving past Roy Lassiter to the top of the league's all-time goal-scoring chart. Kreis remained the MLS all time goalscoring leader for more than three years until Jaime Moreno surpassed his record on August 22, 2007. He ended his ninth MLS season with career totals of 91 goals and 65 assists for 247 points, plus added four goals and two assists in the playoffs. He remains Dallas' all-time leader in games played (247), goals (91), assists (65), and points (247).

Real Salt Lake 

On November 17, 2004, Kreis was traded to expansion team Real Salt Lake, becoming the first player in the club's history. Kreis scored the first goal in Salt Lake's history in its second match, a 3–1 loss to the Los Angeles Galaxy. In doing so, he became the first player in league history to do so for two different teams, as he scored the inaugural goal for Dallas in 1996 as well.

On August 13, 2005, he became the first player in MLS history to score 100 career league goals, during a 4–2 loss to the Kansas City Wizards. The achievement was unexpected from observers, especially out of a 1996 class that included other candidates like Eric Wynalda, Brian McBride, or Joe-Max Moore; Kreis had never been considered a particularly dangerous goalscorer and had only lead the league in scoring once, in 1999.

Kreis was left unprotected in the 2006 MLS Expansion Draft by Real Salt Lake and subsequently chosen by Toronto FC. He was reacquired by Salt Lake on November 17, 2006, with the club sending partial allocation money to Toronto in exchange.

He retired as a player on May 3, 2007, to take over as head coach, finishing with 108 career goals.

International career 
With only 14 international appearances, Kreis was never able to translate his club success into one with the U.S. national team. He received his first cap on August 30, 1996, against El Salvador at the Los Angeles Memorial Coliseum. Kreis scored his only international goal on September 8, 1999, in a 2–2 draw against Jamaica in Kingston.

International goals 

|-
|1.
|September 8, 1999
|National Stadium, Kingston, Jamaica
|
|align="center"|1 – 0
|align="center"|2–2
|align="center"|Friendly
|align="center"|
|}

Coaching career

Real Salt Lake 
On May 3, 2007, Kreis retired from professional competition and was announced as the new head coach of Real Salt Lake, retiring as a player and taking over the coaching reins from John Ellinger. At the time of his hire, Kreis became the youngest active head coach in MLS at 34 years and 127 days. He led Real Salt Lake to its first-post season playoff appearance in 2008 and in 2009 he coached the team to its first MLS Cup championship. Kreis is the youngest coach in MLS history to win the MLS Cup. Following the 2009 MLS Cup win, Kreis would lead Real Salt Lake to playoff appearances in every subsequent season through 2013, including an appearance in the 2013 MLS Cup, which RSL lost to Sporting Kansas City in dramatic fashion on penalty kicks. Kreis also guided Real Salt Lake to a very good CONCACAF Champions League campaign in 2011. Real Salt Lake won Group A and made it all the way to the 2011 CONCACAF Champions League Finals, only to lose to 3–2 on aggregate to C.F. Monterrey.

Real Salt Lake signed Kreis to a contract extension on March 24, 2011, that kept him at the RSL helm through the 2013 season, after which he left RSL to become head coach of New York City FC. Real Salt Lake originally retired Kreis' number 9 jersey from his playing days, but has since reinstated the number with his permission.

New York City FC 
On December 11, 2013, Kreis was announced as the first head coach of New York City FC, having reached the end of his contract at Real Salt Lake and declining an extension offer from RSL so he could take the New York City FC position. The move came just four days after he missed out on lifting his second MLS Cup with the Utah team, losing on penalty kicks to Sporting Kansas City. It was revealed in the announcement that his contract, starting on January 1, 2014, would see him begin by traveling to Manchester in England to familiarize himself with the set-up of franchise-owners Manchester City.

Kreis' inaugural season with NYCFC ended in disappointment. The club finished with a 10–17–7 record in the regular season placing 8th in the Eastern Conference, failing to make the 2015 MLS Cup Playoffs. He and the club parted ways on November 2, 2015.

Orlando City SC 
On July 19, 2016, Kreis was hired by Orlando City SC to replace outgoing inaugural coach Adrian Heath. At Orlando City, he reunited with two of his assistant coaches, Miles Joseph and C. J. Brown, and led the club to its first win in two months during his first game in charge.

On June 15, 2018, Kreis was released by Orlando City.

United States U-23 
On March 19, 2019, Kreis was named head coach of the United States men's national under-23 team.

Fort Lauderdale CF 
On February 15, 2020, Kreis was hired by Inter Miami CF, to coach their USL League One affiliate Fort Lauderdale CF.

Inter Miami CF 
On March 1, 2021, Inter Miami CF announced Kreis as an assistant coach under Phil Neville.

Career statistics

Club

Source: MLS

Coaching statistics

See also 
 List of Major League Soccer coaches

References

External links 
 

1972 births
Living people
American people of German descent
People from Mandeville, Louisiana
Sportspeople from Omaha, Nebraska
Soccer players from Nebraska
American soccer players
Association football midfielders
Duke Blue Devils men's soccer players
All-American men's college soccer players
Raleigh Flyers players
New Orleans Riverboat Gamblers players
FC Dallas players
Real Salt Lake players
USL Championship players
Major League Soccer players
Major League Soccer All-Stars
United States men's international soccer players
American soccer coaches
Real Salt Lake coaches
New York City FC coaches
Orlando City SC coaches
Major League Soccer coaches